Wojnowo  is a village in the administrative district of Gmina Sicienko, within Bydgoszcz County, Kuyavian-Pomeranian Voivodeship, in north-central Poland.

The village has a population of 820.

References

Wojnowo